Jordan Ridley (born 20 October 1998) is a professional Australian rules footballer playing for the Essendon Football Club in the Australian Football League (AFL). He was selected by Essendon with their second selection and twenty-second overall in the 2016 national draft. He made his senior debut for Essendon against Geelong in round nine of the 2018 season.

AFL career
Prior to being drafted he played for Oakleigh Chargers in the NAB League and attended Box Hill High School.

He made his AFL debut against  in round nine of 2018. 

After managing just 9 games across his first 3 years with Essendon he enjoyed a breakthrough season in 2020. He played all 17 games of the shortened season earning selection in the All Australian squad and winning the Crichton Medal as Essendon’s Best and Fairest player. After just 26 senior games he became the third least experienced player in the clubs history to win the award.

Statistics
Statistics are correct to Finals Week 1 2021 

|-
! scope="row" style="text-align:center" | 2018
|  || 14 || 3 || 0 || 0 || 29 || 12 || 41 || 14 || 4 || 0.0 || 0.0 || 9.7 || 4.0 || 13.7 || 4.7 || 1.3
|-
! scope="row" style="text-align:center" | 2019
|  || 14 || 6 || 0 || 0 || 65 || 24 || 89 || 42 || 11 || 0.0 || 0.0 || 10.8 || 4.0 || 14.8 || 7.0 || 1.8
|-
! scope="row" style="text-align:center" | 2020
|  || 14 || 17 || 0 || 2 || 221 || 129 || 304 || 110 || 20 || 0.0 || 0.1 || 12.4 || 5.5 || 17.9 || 6.5 || 1.2
|-
! scope="row" style="text-align:center" | 2021
|  || 14 || 22 || 0 || 0 || 340 || 124 || 464 || 131 || 29 || 0.0 || 0.0 || 15.4 || 5.6 || 21.0 || 5.9 || 1.3
|-
|- class="sortbottom"
! colspan=3| Career
! 48
! 0
! 2
! 645 
! 253
! 898
! 297
! 64
! 0.0 
! 0.0
! 13.4
! 5.2
! 18.7
! 6.1
! 1.3
|}

References

External links

1998 births
Living people
Essendon Football Club players
Australian rules footballers from Victoria (Australia)
Oakleigh Chargers players
Crichton Medal winners